The 1956 Scottish League Cup final was played on 27 October 1956 and replayed on 31 October 1956. Both matches were played at Hampden Park in Glasgow and it was the final of the 11th Scottish League Cup competition. The final was contested by Celtic and Partick Thistle. The first match ended in a goalless draw, necessitating the reply. Celtic won the replay match 3–0, thanks to a goal by Bobby Collins and two goals by John McPhail.

Match details

Replay

References

External links 
 Soccerbase – first match
 Soccerbase – replay

1956
League Cup Final
Celtic F.C. matches
Partick Thistle F.C. matches
1950s in Glasgow